This is a list of places on the Victorian Heritage Register in the Shire of Yarra Ranges in Victoria, Australia. The Victorian Heritage Register is maintained by the Heritage Council of Victoria.

References 

Yarra Ranges
Yarra Ranges